I and I  may refer to:
 An expression in Rastafari vocabulary
 "I and I" (song), a song by Bob Dylan from Infidels
 "I and I", a song by Soulfly from Dark Ages